Ahmet Bahçıvan (born 27 February 1996) is a Turkish footballer who plays as a midfielder for Bayrampaşa.

Career
A youth product of Bozüyükspor, Bahçıvan began his senior career with the club in 2012. He transferred to Adanaspor in 2013, signing a professional contract with them. He helped them win the 2015-16 TFF First League and achieving promotion. He made his professional debut with Adanaspor in a 1–0 Süper Lig loss to Konyaspor on 2 October 2016. He spent most of his early career on loan in the lower leagues of Turkey with Amed SK, Kastamonuspor 1966, Karacabey Belediyespor, and Serik Belediyespor. On 13 August 2021, he transferred to the TFF Third League club Bayrampaşa.

International career
Bahçıvan represented the Turkey U21s for a pair of friendlies in 2017.

References

External links
 
 
 

1996 births
Living people
People from Altındağ, Ankara
Turkish footballers
Turkey under-21 international footballers
Süper Lig players
TFF First League players
TFF Second League players
Bozüyükspor footballers
Adanaspor footballers
Association football midfielders